LMC195-1 is a Wolf–Rayet star located in the Large Magellanic Cloud (LMC). It is an extremely rare member of the WO oxygen sequence, at WO2 the hottest known in the LMC. It is likely to be one of the hottest stars known.

The star was first observed in a 2013 survey of the Magellanic Clouds using the 1m Swope telescope at Las Campanas Observatory in Chile. The survey was intended to identify Wolf–Rayet candidate stars by taking images through narrow-bandwidth filters centred on the 465.0 nm CIII and 468.6 nm HeII spectral lines together with a continuum filter at 475.0 nm. Digital subtraction of the separate images was used to highlight stars with particularly strong emission at one or both of the indicative spectral lines.

The first survey of the Large Magellanic Cloud in October 2013 identified eight previously unknown candidate objects, of which five were later confirmed to be Wolf Rayet stars.  LMC 195-1 is located in the rich LH-41 (NGC 1910) stellar association that contains the luminous blue variable S Doradus as well as another WO star LH 41-1042. The two WO stars are only 9" apart.  WO stars are classified on the basis of OVI emission at 381.1-383.4 nm, which is weak or absent in other Wolf–Rayet stars. The WO2 subclass is defined as having the ratio of OVI to OV emission strength between four and 12.5. Higher values would indicate WO1, while smaller values would be WO3 or WO4. In the new star, the ratio of these line strengths was 4.5.

References

See also
 List of most massive stars
 List of most luminous stars 

Stars in the Large Magellanic Cloud
Dorado (constellation)
Large Magellanic Cloud
Wolf–Rayet stars
Astronomical events in the near future
Extragalactic stars